Purling Hiss is the eponymously titled debut studio album of Purling Hiss, released independently in 2009. Permanent Records adopted the album and issued it on vinyl and repressed and re-issued it in 2014. Evan Minsker of Pitchfork Media called the album "a monster of blown-out, shredding, heavy psych music that consistently locks into a satisfying groove."

Track listing

Personnel
Adapted from the Purling Hiss liner notes.
 Mike Polizze – vocals, instruments

Release history

References

External links 
 
 Purling Hiss at Bandcamp

2009 debut albums
Purling Hiss albums